The Leinster Senior League Cup is the most important provincial cricket knock-out cup of the Leinster jurisdiction in Ireland. The competition began as the Leinster Senior Cup in 1919 and was renamed in 2019.

Traditionally a knock-out competition, from 2019 it has been played in a group format, with the winners and runners-up of two groups qualifying for semi-finals. In 2021, it was played as a T20 competition.

List of finals

1930s

1940s

1950s

1960s

1970s

1980s

1990s

2000s

2010s

2020s

Summary of winners

See also
Leinster Senior League
NCU Challenge Cup

References

Cricket Leinster Archives

External links
 Cricket Leinster

Irish domestic cricket competitions